Shuto Minami (南 秀仁, born 5 May 1993) is a Japanese footballer who plays as a forward for Montedio Yamagata.

Career statistics

Club
Updated to 26 July 2022.

References

External links
Profile at Montedio Yamagata

1993 births
Living people
Association football people from Kanagawa Prefecture
Japanese footballers
J2 League players
Japan Football League players
Tokyo Verdy players
FC Machida Zelvia players
Montedio Yamagata players
Association football midfielders